Akridge is an unincorporated community located in Mitchell County, Georgia, United States.

Geography
Akridge is Located at the intersection of Georgia Highway 37 and Georgia Highway 93. Dozier Norman Road, Beaver Road, Antioch Road, Little Rock Road, Mobile Road, and Stage Coach Road also lie in the area.

References

Unincorporated communities in Georgia (U.S. state)
Unincorporated communities in Mitchell County, Georgia